Kelekolio Paino Hehea (born 2 January 1979) in Vaini, Tonga) is rugby union footballer. His usual position is at lock. He currently plays for Rugby Calvisano after signing from Lyon OU.

Paino spent several seasons playing for Darlington Mowden Park R.F.C., a leading rugby union club in North East England. He played for Tonga at the 2011 Rugby World Cup.

References
 lequipe.fr profile

1979 births
Living people
Lyon OU players
Rugby union locks
Tongan rugby union players
Tonga international rugby union players
Pacific Islanders rugby union players
Tongan expatriate rugby union players
Expatriate rugby union players in France
Expatriate rugby union players in Italy
Tongan expatriate sportspeople in France
Tongan expatriate sportspeople in Italy
People from Tongatapu